Michael J. Reasoner (born August 17, 1960) is a former state representative for Iowa's 95th District and a former assistant majority leader. He served in the Iowa House of Representatives from 2003 to 2011.  He received his BA and JD from Creighton University School of Law.

During his last term in the Iowa House, Reasoner served on the Administration and Rules, Agriculture, and Ways and Means committees.  He also served as vice chair of the Commerce Committee and as a member of the Administration and Regulation Appropriations Subcommtitee.  His political experience includes serving as an assistant minority leader in the Iowa House and serving as Union County Supervisor.

Electoral history
*incumbent

References

External links

Representative Michael J. Reasoner official Iowa General Assembly site
Mike Reasoner State Representative official constituency site
 
Iowa Democratic Party Fifth District

1960 births
Democratic Party members of the Iowa House of Representatives
Living people
Creighton University alumni
Creighton University School of Law alumni
Politicians from Davenport, Iowa
People from Creston, Iowa
County supervisors in Iowa